College of Ophthalmology and Allied Vision Sciences (COAVS) formerly known as Punjab institute of Preventive Ophthalmology (PIPO) is one of the finest Ophthalmic Institute in Pakistan. it is attached with Mayo Hospital which was built in 1872 and was named after Lord Mack Mayo and King Edward Medical University which was built in 1860 and was named after King Edward.

History
In December 1998, Prof Asad Aslam Khan in collaboration with The Fred Hollows Foundation conducted a detailed situation analysis of ophthalmic services available at district level in Punjab. The analysis revealed that the number of ophthalmologists was much less than the required number and no trained ophthalmic paramedic or ophthalmic nurse was available at district level.

In response to the report of the situation analysis, with the intention to improve eye health services in the province, the Punjab health department established a Comprehensive Eye Care Cell (CEC Cell) at Mayo Hospital. In the year 2004, Government of the Punjab, with the addition of teaching faculty for mid-level eye care workers, upgraded it to Punjab Institute of Preventive Ophthalmology (PIPO) to eradicate preventable blindness from the Pakistan.

Observing the tremendous success and achievements of Punjab Institute of Preventive Ophthalmology (PIPO) and in view to start postgraduate and subspecialty courses in Ophthalmology and Allied Vision Sciences, Govt. of Punjab, in 2007, elevated PIPO to College of Ophthalmology & Allied Vision Sciences (COAVS).

Departments

 Vision Science
 Community Ophthalmology
 Vitreoretina
 Pediatric ophthalmology
 Diagnostic Ophthalmology
 Glaucoma & Diagnostic Research
 Research and development
 Ophthalmic pathology & Microbiology
 Information Technology Center
 Information Education & Communication Cell

Auxiliary services
Library
 Computer labs

Attached hostel facilities
 Boys Hostel
 Girls Hostel

Director General/Principal
 Prof. Dr. Asad Aslam Khan (2004- 2021)
 Prof. Dr. Muhammad Suhail Sarwar (2021-2022)
 Prof. Dr. Zahid Kamal Siddiqui (2022-present)

Academic Degrees Offered
Undergraduate
 BS (Hons) Vision Sciences, Optometry.
 BS (Hons) Vision Sciences, Orthoptics.
 BS (Hons) Vision Sciences, Investigative Ophthalmology.
 Ophthalmic Technology Diploma

Nursing
 Diploma in Ophthalmic Nursing

Ophthalmologist
 Fellowship in Vitreoretina
 Fellowship in Pediatric Ophthalmology
 Refresher course for District Ophthalmologist
 Short course in Diagnostic Ophthalmology
 Short course in Laser application
 Short course in Phacoemulcification
 Short course in manual small incision cataract surgery

Student Societies
  Vision Dramatic Society (VDS)
  Vision Literary Society (VLS)
  Vision Debating Society (VDS)
  Vision Photography & Filmography Society (VPFS)
  COAVS Sports Club

References

Universities and colleges in Lahore
Medical colleges in Punjab, Pakistan